Avar(s) or AVAR may refer to:

Peoples and states
 Avars (Caucasus), a modern Northeast Caucasian-speaking people in the North Caucasus, Dagestan, Russia
Avar language, the modern Northeast Caucasian language spoken by the Avars of the North Caucasus, Dagestan, Russia
 Avar Khanate, a former country of the Caucasus Avar
 Pannonian Avars, a medieval nomadic people who lived in Central and Eastern Europe of probable Mongolian origin
 Uar, a medieval Central Asian people also known as the Hephthalites, possibly linked with the Pannonian Avars
 Rouran Khaganate, a state of nomadic Mongolian tribes from the late 4th century until the middle 6th century, possibly linked with the Pannonian Avars

Settlements in Iran 
Avar, Qazvin
Avar, Razavi Khorasan
Avar, Tehran

In science and technology
 Avar (animation variable), a variable in computer-generated imagery
 Avar(), symbol for asymptotic variance, in statistics
 Allan variance, a statistical measure of frequency stability
 Trade name for dermatological drugs that contains a sulfonamide antibiotic
 Football abbreviation of assistant video assistant referee

Other uses
Average value at risk, a coherent risk measure in finance
 Avari (Middle-earth), a group of Elves in the Lord of the Rings fictional universe

Language and nationality disambiguation pages